Princess Maria Elisabeth of Saxony (Maria Elisabeth Apollonia Casimira Francisca Xaveria; 2 February 1736 – 24 December 1818) was a German noblewoman and  titular Princess of Poland, Lithuania and Saxony of the Albertine branch of the House of Wettin.

Biography
Maria Elisabeth was born at the Wilanów Palace in Poland. The eleventh child of fourteen. Her father, Augustus III of Poland, was the Elector of Saxony (as Frederick Augustus II), King of Poland and Grand Duke of Lithuania (as Augustus II). Her mother Maria Josepha, born an Archduchess of Austria, was a first cousin of Empress Maria Theresa. She came from a close family and her parents made sure they put emphasis on a good education. The young princess was educated in Latin, French, Polish, philosophy, geography, religion, drawing, music and dance.

Her sisters included Maria Amalia, Queen of Spain (wife of Charles III of Spain), Maria Josepha, Dauphine of France (mother of Louis XVI), Maria Anna, Electress of Bavaria, Maria Christina, Abbess of Remiremont and Maria Kunigunde, Abbess of Thorn and Essen. Her brothers included two electors of Saxony: Frederick Christian, Charles of Saxony, Duke of Courland, and also Prince Albert of Saxony, Duke of Teschen (son in law of Empress Maria Theresa).

She died on 24 December 1818, unmarried and she had no issue.

Ancestry

References 

1736 births
1818 deaths
Nobility from Warsaw
House of Wettin
18th-century German people
18th-century Polish people
Albertine branch
Burials at Dresden Cathedral
Daughters of kings